The 1974 Minnesota Twins finished 82–80, third in the American League West.

Offseason 
 October 14, 1973: Joe Keough was purchased by the Twins from the Chicago White Sox.
 December 3, 1973: Sergio Ferrer was drafted by the Twins from the Los Angeles Dodgers in the 1973 rule 5 draft.
 On February 11, 1974, Dick Woodson became the first player to invoke the new free agency clause, as he sought $30,000, and the Twins offered $23,000. The arbitrator sided with Woodson.

Regular season 
Only one Twins player made the All-Star Game, second baseman Rod Carew. Carew won his fourth AL batting title with a .364 average, and set a Minnesota record with 180 singles.  Outfielder Bobby Darwin hit 25 HR and drove in 95 runs. Three pitchers had double digit wins: Bert Blyleven (17–17), Joe Decker (16–14), and Dave Goltz (10–10). Bill Campbell showed potential as a reliever, registering 19 saves and 8 relief wins.

Only 662,401 fans attended Twins games, the lowest total in the American League. It was half the number of fans that attended in the 1960s.

Season standings

Record vs. opponents

Notable transactions 
 May 4, 1974: Dick Woodson was traded by the Twins to the New York Yankees for Mike Pazik and cash.
 June 5, 1974: Joe Lis was purchased from the Twins by the Cleveland Indians.
 June 5, 1974: Butch Wynegar was drafted by the Twins in the 2nd round of the 1974 Major League Baseball draft.
 August 19, 1974: Jim Holt was traded by the Twins to the Oakland Athletics for Pat Bourque.

Roster

Player stats

Batting

Starters by position 
Note: Pos = Position; G = Games played; AB = At bats; H = Hits; Avg. = Batting average; HR = Home runs; RBI = Runs batted in

Other batters 
Note: G = Games played; AB = At bats; H = Hits; Avg. = Batting average; HR = Home runs; RBI = Runs batted in

Pitching

Starting pitchers 
Note: G = Games pitched; IP = Innings pitched; W = Wins; L = Losses; ERA = Earned run average; SO = Strikeouts

Other pitchers 
Note: G = Games pitched; IP = Innings pitched; W = Wins; L = Losses; ERA = Earned run average; SO = Strikeouts

Relief pitchers 
Note: G = Games pitched; W = Wins; L = Losses; SV = Saves; ERA = Earned run average; SO = Strikeouts

Awards and honors 
 Danny Thompson, Hutch Award

Farm system

Notes

References 

Player stats from www.baseball-reference.com
Team info from www.baseball-almanac.com

Minnesota Twins seasons
Minnesota Twins season
Minnesota Twins